Lower Mill is the name of a number of mills.

United Kingdom

Windmills
Lower Mill, Dalham, a windmill in Suffolk
Lower Mill, Eastry, a windmill in Kent
Lower Mill, Great Baddow, a windmill in Essex
Lower Mill, Hailsham, a windmill in East Sussex
Lower Mill, Hockwold, a drainage mill in Norfolk
Lower Mill, Poringland, a windmill in Norfolk
Lower Mill, Radwinter, a windmill in Essex
Lower Mill, Stanton, a windmill in Suffolk
Lower Mill, Woodchurch, a windmill in Kent

Watermills

Lower Mill, Cheadle, a watermill in Cheshire
Lower Mill, Crayford, a watermill on the River Cray, Kent
Lower Mill, East Malling, a watermill on the East Malling Stream, Kent
Lower Mill, Shoreham, a watermill on the River Darent, Kent

United States
Elliottville Lower Mill, East Killingly, Connecticut, listed on the National Register of Historic Places (NRHP)
Dorchester-Milton Lower Mills Industrial District, Boston, Massachusetts, NRHP-listed
Lower Mill (Honeoye Falls, New York), NRHP-listed